Lochmaeocles grisescens is a species of beetle in the family Cerambycidae. It was described by Noguera and Chemsak in 1993. It is known from Mexico.

References

grisescens
Beetles described in 1993